The  Toyota Amphitheatre  is an outdoor amphitheater in unincorporated Yuba County, California, United States. It lies in-between Plumas Lake and Wheatland; 35 miles north of Sacramento and 10 miles south of Marysville. It holds 18,500 spectators and is primarily used for rock and country concerts.

History 
The outdoor venue is a $25 million state-of-the-art concert facility serving the greater Sacramento Valley and all of northern California.

It was constructed and opened in 2000 as a 20,000 capacity amphitheatre on 90 acres in Yuba County. Measure R, the public initiative that allowed the amphitheatre to be built passed with 85% of the vote in 1999. Original plans featured sharing the location with a NASCAR-style racetrack, the Yuba County Motorplex. Due to concerns capacity was reduced to 18,500 pending completion of a highway off-ramp on nearby State Route 70. The seating is divided between fixed (approximately 8,000) stadium-style seats and the balance (approximately 10,500) open lawn seating. The lower fixed seating area is divided into three primary seating sections, often referred to as the 100, 200 and Pit sections.

The project was led by Bill Graham Presents and SFX Entertainment. When finished, it featured several notable improvements on the Shoreline model including removable seats in the "pit" area, improved sight lines, and high sound quality. It opened in June 2000 with a sold-out concert featuring Stone Temple Pilots and Papa Roach. Since then, the amphitheatre has featured more than 100 concerts and welcomed more than 2 million guests.

Naming history
Sacramento Valley Amphitheatre 
AutoWest Amphitheatre 
Sleep Train Amphitheatre 
Toyota Amphitheatre

Noted performers

Aaron Carter
Aerosmith
B.B. King
Backstreet Boys
Barenaked Ladies
Blink-182
Coldplay
Counting Crows
Dave Matthews Band
Def Leppard
Depeche Mode
Earth, Wind & Fire
Godsmack
Iron Maiden 
Jimmy Page
John Mellencamp
Journey
Judas Priest
Keith Urban
Kid Rock
Kiss 
Linkin Park
Matchbox Twenty
Mötley Crüe
Nickelback
No Doubt
OneRepublic
5 Seconds of Summer
Pearl Jam
Poison
Red Hot Chili Peppers
Rush
Santana
Steely Dan
Sting
The Who
Third Eye Blind 
Thirty Seconds to Mars
Thomas Rhett
Tim McGraw
Tom Petty and the Heartbreakers
Tool
Whitesnake

The Cure

See also
Live Nation

References

External links 
Toyota Amphitheatre on Live Nation

Amphitheaters in California
Music venues in California
Theatres in California
Buildings and structures in Yuba County, California
Tourist attractions in Yuba County, California